The Acoustic Album is a studio album by the British singer Toyah Willcox, released in 1996. It is a collection of acoustic re-recordings of songs from her back catalogue.

Background
The material was recorded in 1994 and consisted of new, stripped-down versions of classic hits as well as lesser-known, non-single tracks from the Toyah band and Willcox's solo repertoire. Some tracks feature string arrangements performed by members of the Royal Philharmonic Orchestra. The material was originally conceived as part of a double album Toyah Classics which would have also comprised its 'electric' accompaniment Looking Back, slated for release in March 1995. The two sets would eventually be released individually as separate albums. In 2014, The Acoustic Album was re-released by Vertical Species in digital and CD formats, with a new artwork by Alan Sawyers and photography by Dean Stockings.

Track listing
 "The Vow" (Toyah Willcox, Joel Bogen, Phil Spalding) – 3:19
 "Moonlight Dancing" (Willcox, Bogen, Nick Graham) – 4:03
 "Revive the World" (Willcox, Tony Geballe) – 3:13
 "I Want to Be Free" (Willcox, Bogen) – 3:02
 "It's a Mystery" (Piano Version) (Keith Hale) – 4:05
 "Danced" (Willcox, Bogen, Peter Bush) – 4:44
 "Good Morning Universe" (Willcox, Bogen) – 3:24
 "Blue Meanings" (Willcox, Bogen, Bush) – 5:20
 "Jungles of Jupiter" (Willcox, Bogen, Spalding) – 4:55
 "It's a Mystery" (Up Tempo) (Hale) – 3:56
 "Ieya" (Willcox, Bogen, Bush) – 4:35
 "Angels and Demons" (Willcox, Hale) – 6:07
 "I Am" (Willcox, Bogen) – 2:53
 "Thunder in the Mountains" (Willcox, Adrian Lee, Nigel Glockler) – 4:02
 "It's a Mystery" (String Version) (Hale) – 3:57

Personnel
 Toyah Willcox – vocals
 Tony 'Pooh' Kelly – guitars
 David Waddington – guitar
 Bob Skeat – bass, acoustic bass
 Andy Dewar – drums, percussion
 Tacye Lynette – additional vocals

Additional musicians
 The principal string players of the Royal Philharmonic Orchestra headed by Jonathan Carney on tracks 1 and 15

Production
 Oliver Davis – producer
 Paul Maddens – engineer
 David Richardson – executive producer

References

External links
 Official audio stream on YouTube
 The official Toyah website

1996 albums
Toyah Willcox albums